Asparagus asparagoides, commonly known as bridal creeper, bridal-veil creeper, gnarboola, smilax or smilax asparagus, is a herbaceous climbing plant  of the family Asparagaceae native to eastern and southern Africa. Sometimes grown as an ornamental plant, it has become a serious environmental weed in Australia and New Zealand.

Taxonomy
Linnaeus first described this species as Medeola asparagoides in 1753. It has been reclassified in the genus Asparagus by W. Wight in 1909, or Myrsiphyllum by  Carl Ludwig von Willdenow in 1808.

Description
Asparagus asparagoides grows as a herbaceous vine with a scrambling or climbing habit which can reach 3 m (10 ft) in length. It has shiny green leaf-like structures (phylloclades) which are flattened stems rather than true leaves. They measure up to 4 cm long by 2 cm wide. The pendent white flowers appear over winter and spring, from July to September. It is rhizomatous, and bears tubers which reach 6 cm (2.4 in) by 2 cm (1.8 in) in size.

Distribution and habitat
It ranges throughout tropical Africa, south to Namibia, and the fynbos in South Africa, as far south as Cape Town.

It has become naturalised in parts of southern California and Australia, where it is considered an invasive plant.

Uses
Asparagus asparagoides, often under the name smilax, is commonly used in floral arrangements or home decorating.

Invasive species

A. asparagoides is a major weed species in southern Australia and in New Zealand. In Australia, it is listed as a Weed of National Significance.

It was introduced to Australia from South Africa around 1857, for use as a foliage plant, especially in bridal bouquets (hence the common name). It has escaped into the bush and smothers the native vegetation with the thick foliage and thick underground mat of tubers which restrict root growth of other species. It is recognised as one of the 20 "weeds of national significance". The seeds are readily spread in the droppings of birds, rabbits and foxes, as well as the plant extending its root system.
CSIRO have introduced several biological controls in an attempt to reduce the spread and impact of the weed.

In New Zealand A. asparagoides is listed under the National Pest Plant Accord and is classified as an "unwanted organism".

References

Further reading

External links
Weeds of Australia Asparagus asparagoides
United States Department of Agriculture Plants Profile: Asparagus asparagoides
photo of herbarium specimen at Missouri Botanical Garden
 

asparagoides
Flora of South Africa
Renosterveld
Creepers of South Africa
Plants described in 1753
Taxa named by Carl Linnaeus
Garden plants of Southern Africa
Vines
Invasive plant species in Australia